Farid Rastagar(born 26 March 1963) is from Panjshir, a singer, music arranger, and composer. He is one of the 1980s era singers who rose to popularity as Afghanistan’s pop music was reaching its zenith of maturity. His early albums became highly successful due to the keen detail he gave to the background music all of which he arranged, composed and sang himself. Currently, he continues producing his music from Hamburg, Germany, his home since he emigrated from Afghanistan, often performing in various cities in Europe.

His wife Wajiha Rastagar and his daughter Hadya Rastagar are also singers. He belongs to the Panjsher Valley of Afghanistan.

Discography 
Ghame gandom
Rah-e-Dor
Khana-e-Dil
Delak-e-Khoshbawar
Hadya
Dar Parda Hai Saz
Alocha
Trirari 
Hasheq Bedarast

External links
Official website of Farid and Wajiha Rastagar
Farid and Wajiha Rastagar's MySpace
Farid and Wajiha Rastagar's Albums & Songs

1963 births
Living people
Afghan singers
Afghan musicians
Afghan composers
Afghan male singers
Persian-language singers
People from Panjshir Province
Afghan expatriates in Germany
20th-century Afghan male singers